Euxoa muldersi is a moth of the family Noctuidae. It is known only from north central Canada with all specimens except two from the vicinity of Arviat, Nunavut. It is restricted to open dunes where it flies close to the sand.

The species is believed to use a similar pheromone to Euxoa churchillensis as males of
E. churchillensis were observed being attracted to calling E. muldersi females, although no attempts at mating were observed.

Etymology
The species is named for Robert Mulders, a biologist at Arviat who collected the first specimen and brought it to the attention of Henry Hensel.

External links
A Synopsis of the westermanni Group of the Genus Euxoa Hbn. (Lepidoptera: Noctuidae) With Descriptions of Two New Species

Euxoa
Moths of North America
Moths described in 2010